Atlas was a 501-ton sailing ship that was built at Whitby and launched in 1811. In 1814 she successfully defended herself in a single-ship action with an American privateer. In 1816 she transported convicts to New South Wales, and afterwards disappeared off the coast of India in 1817.

Career
Atlas entered Lloyd's Register in 1812 with W. Parker, master, changing to Fairclough, T. Barrick, owner, and trade London transport.

On 9 January 1813 Atlas was at Lisbon when she lost an anchor in a gale. A number of other transports were either lost or seriously damaged in the same gale. The number of transports involved suggests that they were their in connection with the Peninsular War.

The transport Atlas, Fairclough, master, arrived at Cork on 19 August 1814. She had on 17 August repelled an attack by the American privateer York, of 14 guns and 150 men. Atlas had only 10 guns and 27 men and boys on board, including three passengers.

Convict voyage (1816): Under the command of Walter Meriton, she sailed from Portsmouth, England on 23 January 1816, and arrived at Port Jackson on 22 July. She embarked 194 male convicts, seven of whom died on the voyage. A detachment of 34 men of the 89th Regiment of Foot provided the guard. 

Atlas left Port Jackson on 12 September bound for Batavia.

Loss
On 29 July 1817, Atlas dropped the pilot at Sandheads, at the mouth of the River Ganges, as she sailed from Calcutta to London. She was not heard from again.

Lloyd's Register continued to carry Atlas, with Meriton, master, and trade London—Botany Bay, to the 1821 volume. The Register of Shipping carried the same information to the 1822 volume.

Notes, citations, and references
Notes

Citations

References
 
 
  

1811 ships
Ships built in Whitby
Convict ships to New South Wales
Ships of the British East India Company
Maritime incidents in 1817
Age of Sail merchant ships
Missing ships
Ships lost with all hands